Mount Cook is a  mountain located in the Garibaldi Ranges of the Coast Mountains, in northwestern Garibaldi Provincial Park of southwestern British Columbia, Canada. The Armchair Glacier is set between Cook and Weart, and the Weart Glacier rests on the northern slope of Cook. Precipitation runoff from the peak and meltwater from the glaciers drains into Wedgemount Lake and Green River.

The mountain was known as Miniweart and North Wedge before the Cook name was submitted June 1977 by mountaineers Neal Carter and Karl Ricker of the Alpine Club of Canada. The mountain's name was officially adopted March 9, 1979, by the Geographical Names Board of Canada.

Climate

Based on the Köppen climate classification, Mount Cook is located in the marine west coast climate zone of western North America. Most weather fronts originate in the Pacific Ocean, and travel east toward the Coast Mountains where they are forced upward by the range (Orographic lift), causing them to drop their moisture in the form of rain or snowfall. As a result, the Coast Mountains experience high precipitation, especially during the winter months in the form of snowfall. Temperatures can drop below −20 °C with wind chill factors below −30 °C. The months July through September offer the most favorable weather for climbing Cook.

Climbing Routes
Established rock climbing routes on Mount Cook:

 West Ridge -  
 East Ridge -

See also

 Geography of British Columbia
 Geology of British Columbia

References

External links
 Mount Cook summit: YouTube

Garibaldi Ranges
Two-thousanders of British Columbia
Sea-to-Sky Corridor
New Westminster Land District